State Highway 40 was part of the New Zealand state highway network before it was revoked in 1991–92.

Route
SH 40 left  at the small locality of Ahititi, north of New Plymouth. The route follows the Tongaporutu River and its tributaries, passing through the high King Country hills and the locality of Kotare. After Waitaanga, the road passes over the Waitaanga saddle and enters the Ohura River valley. At Ohura, old  intersects with SH 40 at a TOTSO junction. It follows the Stratford to Okahukura Line along with the Ohura River until Tuhua, after passing through Nihoniho and Matiere.

See also
List of New Zealand state highways

References 

40
New Plymouth District